The 2006–2007 UCI Cyclo-cross World Cup events and season-long competition takes place between 1 October 2006 and 21 January 2007 and is sponsored by the Union Cycliste Internationale (UCI).

Men results

Men rankings
Rankings as of 11 December 2006

Women results

Women rankings
Rankings as of 27 December 2006

See also
 2006/07 Cyclo-cross Superprestige
 2006/07 Cyclo-cross Gazet van Antwerpen

External links
 Cyclo-cross.info  
 Official website

World Cup
World Cup
UCI Cyclo-cross World Cup